Stephanie Jallen (born February 13, 1996), nicknamed Hopper, is an American skier. She qualified for the 2014 Winter Paralympics competing for Team USA and won a bronze in the standing Super-G and Super combined.

Personal history 
Stephanie Jallen was born on 13 February 1996 in Kingston, Pennsylvania. Jallen was born with CHILD syndrome, Congenital Hemidysplasia with Ichthyosis and Limb Defects Syndrome. This meant that Jallen's left leg had to be amputated, her left side is under-developed, and she suffers from rashes. Her nickname, Hopper, comes from the fact that when her prosthetic limbs weren't being worn, she had to hop. Jallen has always been active and learned to play soccer with her friends. She does have a crutch but she uses it mainly for balance and is happy to stand or move around on her leg. In an interview she said that she would not want to have her limbs back to normal as that would just make her "boring". Jallen is studying at King's College in hopes of earning a business degree.

Career 
Jallen was introduced to skiing at a 2006 winter ski clinic in Pennsylvania. Her international debut was in 2011. In that year, she was the US slalom champion after coming first in the event.

She has encouraged Iraq war amputees and when she was eleven in 2007 she spoke at Harrisburg to the Pennsylvania senate and told them not to give up.

In 2012, she "lacerated" her face in Kimberley, British Columbia in a Super-G event. The resulting wound needed twelve facial stitches. She also fractured her tibia plateau and partly tore a knee ligament. Jallen has also suffered head and back injuries, as well as undergone surgeries to the knee and ankle.

Paralympics 
At her début Paralympics, the 2014 Winter Paralympics in Sochi, Jallen competed for Team USA in three events: the Super-G, the slalom, and the super combined (Jallen is competing in standing in all events). She was the second-youngest member of the national team. She came third in the Super-G, finishing 5.94 seconds behind Marie Bochet; also finishing behind Solène Jambaqué, both of France. Jallen came third in the super combined with a time of 1:25.15 seconds, 4.74 seconds behind Bochet, who won.
However, Jallen did not finish the slalom and fell in the giant slalom.

References

External links 
 
 

People from Kingston, Pennsylvania
Living people
Paralympic alpine skiers of the United States
Alpine skiers at the 2014 Winter Paralympics
1996 births
Paralympic bronze medalists for the United States
American amputees
Medalists at the 2014 Winter Paralympics
American female alpine skiers
Paralympic medalists in alpine skiing
21st-century American women